Tolo is a town on the Lukenie River in Kutu territory of Mai-Ndombe province of the Democratic Republic of the Congo.
It was founded as a colonial post by Alexandre Delcommune around 1887.

References

Populated places in Mai-Ndombe Province
1887 establishments